Nawapas Pisanuwong (born 1 January 2001) is a Thai swimmer. She competed in the women's 100 metre breaststroke event at the 2017 World Aquatics Championships.

References

2001 births
Living people
Nawapas Pisanuwong
Place of birth missing (living people)
Female breaststroke swimmers